Daniel England (July 1, 1868 – February 7, 1948) was an American merchant and politician who served as the 7th Mayor of Pittsfield, Massachusetts.

Early life
England was born in Pittsfield, Massachusetts on July 1, 1868.  He was educated in the public schools.

Business career
In 1892 England entered into the dry goods business with the firm of England Brothers.

At the time of his death England was the vice president and treasurer of the England Brothers department store.

Public service

Pittsfield Common Council
In 1897 England served on the Pittsfield Common Council where he served on the Financial and Fire Department Committees.

Massachusetts House of Representatives
In 1898 England served in the Massachusetts House of Representatives, where he served on the Committee on Railroads.

Mayor of Pittsfield
In 1902 England was elected as the 7th Mayor of Pittsfield, Massachusetts.

Marriage
On June 16, 1908 England married Myra Lewl Bendell, daughter of Dr. and Mrs. Herman Bendell, at her family home on Capital Hill in Albany, New York. Bendell had been a military surgeon during the American Civil War and was appointed as Superintendent of Indian Affairs for Arizona in 1871.

Death
England died on February 7, 1948.

Notes

1868 births
1948 deaths
Massachusetts city council members
Mayors of Pittsfield, Massachusetts
Members of the Massachusetts House of Representatives
American businesspeople in retailing